The Greaney Nunataks are low nunataks lying southwest of the Herring Nunataks and  west of Mount Lechner in the western Forrestal Range, Pensacola Mountains. They were mapped by the United States Geological Survey from surveys and from U.S. Navy air photos, 1956–66, and named by the Advisory Committee on Antarctic Names for David B. Greaney, an aviation electrician at Ellsworth Station, winter 1957.

References 

Nunataks of Queen Elizabeth Land